Muthuchippikal is a 1980 Indian Malayalam film,  directed by Hariharan and produced by C. Das. The film stars Madhu, Srividya, Hari and Sankaradi in the lead roles. The film has musical score by K. J. Joy.

Cast

Madhu
Srividya
Hari
Sankaradi
T. R. Omana
Praveena
C. Das
Sathaar
M. G. Soman
Mala Aravindan
Nellikode Bhaskaran
Oduvil Unnikrishnan
P. K. Abraham
Paravoor Bharathan
Bhavani

Soundtrack
The music was composed by K. J. Joy and the lyrics were written by A. P. Gopalan and Muringoor Sankara Potti.

References

External links
 

1980 films
1980s Malayalam-language films
Films directed by Hariharan